The Saeima and State President Security Service (DD) was a separate unit of the National Armed Forces of Latvia. It provided security to the Parliament and State President, guarded objects, institutions and persons of national importance. Beginning with January 1, 2009, the Security Service was merged into the Latvian Military Police which now carries out the duties of the Security Service .

Mission 

The main mission of the Security Service was to:

 Provide security for the State President, his/her family members, the State President’s Chancellery and Residence;
 Provide security to Members of Parliament, the Presidium of the Parliament and its affiliated institutions (objects);
 Provide security to foreign officials and representatives of international organizations during their official visits to Latvia

Cooperation 

The Security Service maintained close cooperation with the State Chancellery. While providing security to high-level officials in Latvia and abroad, the Security Service also coordinated its activities with the respective foreign security service. Security Service soldiers have demonstrated their excellent fitness in diverse NAF sports games, where they are frequently awarded first prize at individual and team sports.
As of 2009, the Security Service no longer exists as a separate unit, having been merged with the Military Police.

References

External links 
 Ministry of Defense of the Republic of Latvia
 Mission of Latvia to NATO

 
Protective security units